These fraternities are all members of the Cartellverband.

The umbrella organizations are listed on a yellow background. 
Each fraternity is listed under its umbrella organization and is identified by a token consisting of the first letter of the umbrella organization and the membership number, based on the date of entry into the Cartellverband.

OM: free (open) member (without number)
AM: associated member (without number)
FM: former member (without number)

Information on fraternities of the Cartellverband are quoted form CV Sekretariat (publisher), Gesamtverzeichnis des CV (Cartellverband) 2001 Pg A45 - A57 and the Homepage https://web.archive.org/web/20070928005324/https://www.cartellverband.de/pub/b/frame.asp?m=58
Information on fraternities of the Österreichischer Cartellverband are quoted from the homepage: http://www.vcv.at/oecv/c-vboecv.htm

List